Joan Sanderson (24 November 1912 – 24 May 1992) was a British television and stage actress born in Bristol. During a long career, her tall and commanding disposition led to her playing mostly dowagers, spinsters and matrons, as well as intense Shakespearean roles. Her television work included the sitcoms Please Sir! (1968–72), Fawlty Towers (1979) and Me and My Girl (1984–88).

Theatre
Born and educated in Bristol, Sanderson trained at RADA. She had teaching diplomas in elocution. She appeared in repertory theatres, on the West End stage and at the Stratford Memorial Theatre, where she made her début in 1939 playing Amelia in The Comedy of Errors, a phase in her career that culminated in 1953 when she played both Goneril to Michael Redgrave's King Lear, and Queen Margaret in Richard III.
 
During the Second World War she gained experience in repertory and toured North Africa and Italy entertaining the troops. In 1948, she married fellow actor Gregory Moseley. 

She achieved her apotheosis as Delia, Lady Rumpers, in Habeas Corpus by Alan Bennett (Lyric Theatre 1973). She starred in numerous West End productions including See How They Run and Anyone for Denis?

TV and film
She played Doris Ewell in the television comedy series Please Sir! (1968–72) and Mrs Pugh-Critchley, in the series All Gas and Gaiters (1970–71), as well as a role in the short-lived sitcom Wild, Wild Women (1969). In 1979, she played the abrasive and selectively deaf Mrs Richards in the Fawlty Towers episode, "Communication Problems". She also appeared in After Henry, a gently comic series on both radio (1985–88) and television (1988–92), in which she played the domineering Eleanor, mother of Sarah (Prunella Scales, who starred in Fawlty Towers), who lives below her in the basement flat in Sarah's large house. 

Film roles were rare but she appeared in the Hylda Baker film She Knows Y'Know (1962), Who Killed the Cat? (1966), the film version of Please Sir! (1971), The Great Muppet Caper (1981), playing John Cleese's wife, and Prick Up Your Ears (1987), the film based on the life of playwright Joe Orton.

Personal life
Joan Sanderson died of natural causes in Norwich on 24 May 1992, aged 79. A memorial service was held for her four days later at St Paul's, Covent Garden.

The final series of After Henry was broadcast July-August 1992, following her death; the last episode of which paid tribute to Sanderson.

Credits

TV and film

Radio

References

External links

1912 births
1992 deaths
English film actresses
English radio actresses
English stage actresses
English television actresses
Actresses from Bristol
Alumni of RADA
English Shakespearean actresses
20th-century English actresses